Richard Pulham,  D.D. was a priest and academic in the 14th century.

Pulham became a Fellow of Gonville Hall, Cambridge in 1353; and of Corpus Christi in 1377.  He held livings in Lincoln, Belton and Rochester. Pulham was Master of Gonville from 1393 until 1412.

References 

Fellows of Gonville Hall, Cambridge
Fellows of Corpus Christi College, Cambridge
Masters of Gonville Hall, Cambridge
15th-century English people
14th-century English people